Tirupati West Halt railway station (station code: TPW) is located at Tirupati  of Tirupati district of the Indian state of Andhra Pradesh. It serves as the second station besides Tirupati main station under Guntakal railway division of South Coast Railway zone. It is a broad gauge electrified line.

See also 
Tiruchanur railway station
Renigunta Junction railway station

References

External links 

Transport in Tirupati
Railway stations in Tirupati district
Guntakal railway division